Ethylbenzene hydroperoxide is the organic compound with the formula C6H5CH(O2H)CH3.  A colorless liquid, EBHP is a common hydroperoxide.  It has been used as an O-atom donor in organic synthesis.  It is chiral.  Together with tert-butyl hydroperoxide and cumene hydroperoxide, ethylbenzene hydroperoxide is important commercially.

The compound is produced by direct reaction of ethylbenzene with oxygen, an autoxidation.

References

Hydroperoxides
Oxidizing agents
Benzene derivatives